The 2013 NBA Development League expansion draft was the sixth expansion draft of the National Basketball Association Development League (D-League). The draft was held on August 29, 2013, so that the newly founded Delaware 87ers could acquire players for the upcoming 2013–14 season. The 16 players were chosen from a pool of unprotected players among the league's teams. Each returning D-League team could protect up to 12 of their players from being selected.

Two of the players that the Legends chose had previously been named NBA D-League All-Stars: Leo Lyons and Sean Williams. A Boston College alumnus, Williams was also one of two players taken who had previously been selected in an NBA Draft (Darington Hobson was the other).

Key

Draft

References
General

Specific

draft
NBA G League expansion draft
Delaware Blue Coats
August 2013 events in the United States
2013 in sports in New York City